Boško Mitrović (1903–15), known by the nom de guerre Virjanac (Вирјанац) or Virčanac (Вирчанац), was a Serbian Chetnik commander.

Early life
He was from Vir, in Poreče, at the time part of the Manastir Vilayet, Ottoman Empire (now Makedonski Brod, R. Macedonia).

Serbian Chetnik Organization
The Prilep group, led by Boško, descended into Prilep crossing Prisat and Pletvar on the Crna Reka.

His monthly pay by the Serbian government in 1909 was 60 dinars. In 1911, it was 3 lira.

Balkan Wars
In 1913 he participated in the suppression of the Ohrid-Debar uprising, a joint Bulgarian-Albanian uprising in Western Macedonia against the new Serbian government.

First World War
During the First World War, he was part of Jovan Babunski's band. The band left Azot and entered the Klepe mountain region, where they were informed of a Bulgarian band that hid in a mill in Skačinci. Boško died during the attack.

Annotations
According to state documents his full name was Boško Mitrović. Vasilije Trbić, his fellow fighter, wrote his name in his memoirs as Boško Virjanac (Бошко Вирјанац), while contemporary Ivan Ivanić spelled it Virčanac (Бошко Вирчанац).

See also
 List of Chetnik voivodes

References

Sources

People from Makedonski Brod Municipality
Serbs of North Macedonia
Chetniks of the Macedonian Struggle
20th-century Serbian people
1915 deaths
Chetniks in the Balkan Wars
Serbian military personnel of World War I
Serbian military personnel killed in World War I
Royal Serbian Army soldiers